Propalticus santhomeae is a species of cucujoid beetles of the family Propalticidae. It occurs in São Tomé and Príncipe on the island of São Tomé. The species was described in 1960.

References

Propalticidae
Beetles of Africa
Beetles described in 1960
Insects of São Tomé and Príncipe
Fauna of São Tomé Island